Rondinella is a surname. Notable people with the surname include:

Giacomo Rondinella (1923–2015), Italian singer and actor
Luciano Rondinella (died 2020), Italian singer and actor

Italian-language surnames